Muralles is a surname from Spain, and is also sparingly dispersed over the geographical region of Latin America. 

Surnames

Geographical distribution
As of 2014, the frequency of the surname Muralles was highest in the following countries:

 1. Costa Rica (1: 90)
 2. Spain (1: 547)
 3. Guatemala (1: 113)
 4. Belize (1: 133)
 5. Argentina (1: 136)
 6. Venezuela (1: 170)
 7. Peru (1: 181)
 8. Chile (1: 201)
 9. Colombia (1: 282)
 10. Cuba (1: 340)
 11. Palau (1: 387)
 12. Andorra (1: 461)
 13. Bolivia (1: 538)
 14. Paraguay (1: 777)
 15. Uruguay (1: 1,102)

In the United States, the frequency of Muralles was 1: 1,949. The frequency was higher than the national average in the following states:

 1. California (1: 563)
 2. New Mexico (1: 619)
 3. Connecticut (1: 874)
 4. Arizona (1: 1,156)
 5. Hawaii (1: 1,222)
 6. Florida (1: 1,639)
 7. New Jersey (1: 1,019)

References

Spanish-language surnames